The Maynard Ferguson Sextet (also released as Six by Six) is an album released by Canadian jazz trumpeter Maynard Ferguson featuring tracks recorded in 1965 and originally released on the Mainstream label. The 1991 CD rerelease was titled Magnitude and featured three previously unreleased tracks from the sessions.

Reception

AllMusic awarded the album 4 stars calling it an excellent album and states "Although this group did not last long, their mainstream recording has excellent performances and good solos from the somewhat forgotten band".

Track listing

Personnel 
Maynard Ferguson - trumpet, flugelhorn
Lanny Morgan - alto saxophone, flute
Willie Maiden - tenor saxophone, baritone saxophone
Mike Abene - piano, celesta
 Ronnie McClure - bass  
 Tony Inzalaco - drums

References 

1965 albums
Maynard Ferguson albums
Mainstream Records albums
Albums produced by Bob Shad